Umberghar is a small village located at coast of Vashisthi River(Dabhol Khadi) in Ratnagiri district in the state of Maharashtra in India. It is 256 km away from the state capital of Mumbai.

Geography 

 Umberghar is a village which is located about 31.5 km from Dapoli. It has a consistent elevation from the coastal region to the hilly region. As part of the Western Ghats, the forests are evergreen, consisting mainly of tropical forest. Alphonso mangos, cashew Nuts, jack fruit & coconuts are grown commercially in this area. The place is subjected to different kind of weathers all around the year and so the flora and fauna are affected accordingly.

Main Spoken language is Kokani and most of the people belong to a single large family with common last name as 'Dabir'. While also there are few people with last names as Kupe, Kazi & Naik . 

Major followed religion is Islam.

Close neighbour villages names are "Seemewadi" to the North-west and "Pandheri" to the East.

Education 

The village has a very old school named Zilla Parishad Full Primary Urdu School Umberghar. Mostly Students travel to Dapoli or Mumbai for Higher Education.

Transportation 

Umberghar is connected to Dapoli, the closest town, by MSRTC buses, private taxis and autorickshaws. It is also connected to State capital Mumbai by direct MSRTC buses.

Umberghar is situated around 31.5  km from Dapoli. State Transport buses run at an interval of thrice a day. Buses start from Dapoli ST depot & Mumbai Central Bus depot and drop passengers at Umberghar Bus Stand. In addition, private transport jeeps and rickshaws run between Dapoli and Umberghar.

Places of interest 

About 1.5 km away from north of the village, there is a natural waterfall area named as Amboro and is visited by most of the villagers and outsiders as a picnic spot.

About 1 km from the village to the top of the village mountain, there is an oasis-like lake called as Talaav which is also visited by villagers and outsiders as a picnic spot. Talaav is also used as a means for water resource in the village.

The village has two dock sites, one is called as pakhti and other is called as pantoon, which are famous for fishing, swimming, and a sightseeing point.

Villagers visit places such as forest, river, dock site, cricket ground and gardens around the village in their free time (mostly during summer season).

Jama Masjid is a very beautiful Mosque located at the center of the village, where five-time prayers are performed by villagers and it is the place for general gatherings/meetings.

References 
District Census Handbook  (PDF)

External links

Ratnagiri district
Talukas in Maharashtra

Villages in Ratnagiri district